Elections to Restormel Borough Council were held on 6 May 1999.  The whole council was up for election and the Liberal Democrat party lost overall control of the council.

Results

|}

References

1999 English local elections
1999
1990s  in Cornwall